My Father Deceived Me (aliases: My Father Tricked Me , translit. Khadaini abi) is a 1951 Egyptian film written and directed by Mahmoud Zulfikar. It stars Mahmoud Zulfikar, Sabah and Taheyya Kariokka.

Plot 
Kawthar is a girl who works in the telephone service, and is in love with Mamdouh, a poor young man. Mamdouh proposes to marry Kawthar, but her father refuses and sees that she must marry Shaaban, the rich man, and under her father's pressure, Kawthar marries Shaaban, and lives in his villa in which she resides with him and his daughter who has a mental illness. One of the misfits tries to kill Shaaban, but by chance Mamdouh saves him from fate, and Shaaban could not reward him except by entrusting him with managing the casino he owns, in a confrontation between Kawthar and the villa's maid, the maid declares to her that she is Shaaban's wife, and this is a secret between them, and she also told her that Shaaban, this rich man, is nothing but a forger of money. Others he controls so as not to reveal his secret, Kawthar manages to report Shaaban and brings the police to arrest him and his gang, but the maid rushes and kills Shaaban, and at the end Mamdouh marries Kawthar.

Crew 

 Directed by: Mahmoud Zulfikar
 Story: Mahmoud Zulfikar, Aziza Amir
 Screenplay: Mahmoud Zulfikar, Aziza Amir
 Dialogue: Saleh Gawdat
 Director of Photography: Mostafa Hassan
 Editing: Albert Naguib
 Production: Mahmoud Zulfikar films – Aziza Amir films
 Distribution: Bahna films
 Songwriting: Bayram al-Tunisi, Fathi Kora
 Songs composed by: Farid Ghusn, Ahmed Sidqi, Youssef Saleh, Mohammed El-Bakkar

Cast

Primary cast 

 Mahmoud Zulfikar: (Mamdouh)
 Sabah: (Kawthar)
 Taheyya Kariokka: (the Dancer Taheyya)
 Stephan Rosti: (Shaaban Bey - Kawthar's husband)
 Zahrat El-Ola: (Naima - daughter of Shaaban)
 Nigma Ibrahim: (Fatima)
 Mahmoud Shokoko: (Crusoe - Mamdouh's friend)
 Mohammed El-Bakkar: (singer Bakkar)
 Herimin: (show dancer)
 Mohammed Sobeih: (waiter)
 Abdul-Ghani El-Nagdi: (Seller of Robabikia)
 Sanaa Samih: (Rajaa - Kawthar's aunt)
 Mohsen Hassanein: (from the gang)
 Abdel Moneim Bassiouni: (employee)
 Abdulaziz Ahmed: (Kawthar's father)

Supporting cast 

 Selim Bastawy
 Thoraya
 Abdul Moneim Ismail
 Muhammed Hassan Dawood
 Kamel Othman Kanti
 Inshirah El-Alfi
 Nadia El-Sabaa

References

External links 

 

Egyptian black-and-white films
1951 films
1951 drama films
Egyptian drama films
1950s Arabic-language films